Seiler und Speer is an Austrian band from Bad Vöslau that formed in 2014. The band is composed of comedian and actor Christopher Seiler and film producer Bernhard Speer.

History 
Both artists started their collaboration in 2014, when Christopher Seiler started his project "Schichtwechsel" (change of shifts). Bernhard Speer was  producer and director. Christopher Seiler performed his first cabaret displays and wanted to accompany them with music.

The texts, sung in Austrian dialect, caricature various situations out of daily life with Austrian humor. What was only intended to be a humorous project in the beginning grew into a first album.

Seiler and Speer performed in front of 100,000 attendees at a concert for solidarity for asylum seekers at Heldenplatz, Vienna. They received a gold record for 7,500 units sold in October 2015. In December 2015, they received a platinum certification for 15,000. The mix of romanticism, everyday comical situations and popular songs became a success.

Horvathslos 
Anton Horvath is a fictional character, performed by Christopher Seiler in the comedy video series "Horvathslos" created by Seiler und Speer. Horvath is an ever-unemployed drunkard with an oversized ego, who often lies about himself to make himself seem more impressive. Bernhard Speer plays the role of a reporter filming a documentary about Horvath. The series consists of two seasons, each with eight episodes. Only the first five episodes of the first season may be viewed for free online. The rest are only available on DVD by Preiser Records.

Discography

Albums

Singles

References

External links 
 Website of Seiler und Speer
 Interview: meinbezirk.at
 Article: falter.at

Austrian comedy musical groups